Marinobacter psychrophilus is a Gram-negative, rod-shaped, psychrophilic and motile bacterium from the genus of Marinobacter which has been isolated from sea-ice of the Canadian Basin.

References

External links
Type strain of Marinobacter psychrophilus at BacDive -  the Bacterial Diversity Metadatabase

Alteromonadales
Bacteria described in 2008
Psychrophiles